Zoltán Pollák (born 13 January 1984) is a Hungarian international footballer currently playing for Szigetszentmiklósi TK.

He plays in defence both for his country and his club Újpest FC who he joined from his previous club, BFC Siófok.

He made his international debut against Estonia on 2 December 2004.

External links

HLSZ

1984 births
Living people
Sportspeople from Miskolc
Hungarian footballers
Association football defenders
Hungary international footballers
BFC Siófok players
MTK Budapest FC players
Újpest FC players
Szigetszentmiklósi TK footballers
Nemzeti Bajnokság I players